Salem Methodist Church is a historic Methodist church located near Huntsboro, Granville County, North Carolina. It was likely designed by noted regional architect Jacob W. Holt and constructed by slaves in 1860–1861. It is a one-story, three bay, heavy timber frame, church building with Greek Revival, Italianate, and Gothic Revival style design elements.  Also on the property is the contributing church cemetery.

It was listed on the National Register of Historic Places in 1988.

References

Methodist churches in North Carolina
Churches on the National Register of Historic Places in North Carolina
Greek Revival church buildings in North Carolina
Gothic Revival architecture in North Carolina
Italianate architecture in North Carolina
Churches completed in 1861
19th-century Methodist church buildings in the United States
Churches in Granville County, North Carolina
National Register of Historic Places in Granville County, North Carolina
1861 establishments in North Carolina
Historic districts on the National Register of Historic Places in North Carolina
Italianate church buildings in the United States